Anstein Birger Gjengedal (born 26 November 1944) is a former Norwegian police chief.

He was born in Lom. He was a public prosecutor in Eidsivating from 1977 until 1989 when he became deputy director of the Norwegian National Authority for the Investigation and Prosecution of Economic and Environmental Crime. He then served as director from 1996 to 2000, and in 2000 he became Chief of Police of Oslo, until his successor Hans Sverre Sjøvold took over in June 2012.

He is currently the director for the Prosecution Committee in Anti-doping Norge. He has been an ever-present member of the Trial Committee for the Norwegian Skating Association since being elected in 1980.

In his youth Gjengedal competed as a speed skater for Lom Idrettslag until 1961 and then joined Lillehammer Skøiteklubb for the seasons 1961/62–1963/64 and from 1964/65-season he changed his club again and this time to Oslo Idrettslag.

References

External links
 Anstein Gjengedal at www.nsd.uib.no/polsys/
 Anstein Gjengedal at www.speedskatingnews.info
 Anstein Gjengedal at www.speedskatingbase.eu (personal speed skating records)

1944 births
Living people
People from Oppland
People from Lom, Norway
20th-century Norwegian lawyers
Directors of government agencies of Norway
Norwegian police chiefs
Norwegian male speed skaters
Sportspeople from Innlandet